INTO Queen's University Belfast is a joint-venture study centre between Queen's University Belfast and INTO University Partnerships. Announced in July 2009, the international college provides foundation programmes, International Diplomas, Graduate Diplomas, and English for University Study programmes for international students. Its international foundation programme offers a direct route to a range of undergraduate and postgraduate degrees in areas such as (i) such as science, engineering, computing and mathematics; and (ii)  businesses, humanities and social sciences.

In January 2010, the centre moved to newly refurbished premises at Lennoxvale within walking distance of both the University campus and Elms Village Student accommodation. Located within two Georgian houses, the centre offers courses for more than 400 international students.. Since its establishment, more than 500 students have progressed to degree programmes at Queen's University Belfast alone, with progression to a wide range of UK universities.

Background
INTO University Partnerships is a global organisation that works with universities worldwide on transformational internationalisation strategies through joint venture partnerships. It has a marketing network of over 600 agents and regional presence in 15 key countries. As of 2008/09, over 4,600 students have commenced their academic preparation and English language courses from the different study centres in the UK.

See also
 Business-education partnerships
 International Foundation, a year-long programme to prepare International students for undergraduate study at UK universities
 Graduate Diploma, an academic pre - masters course to prepare international students for postgraduate study at UK universities 
International Diploma, equivalent to studying year one of an undergraduate university degree, upon successful completion, international students can progress to year two of their chosen undergraduate degree
 English for University Study, a full-time English language programme designed to help prepare International students for entry to undergraduate and postgraduate degree programmes at university

References

External links
 
 

Queen's University Belfast
Joint ventures
Companies based in Belfast
Language schools in the United Kingdom